Scared Stiff is a 1953 American horror paranormal semi-musical comedy film directed by George Marshall and starring Dean Martin and Jerry Lewis. One of the 17 films made by the Martin and Lewis team, it was released on April 27, 1953 by Paramount Pictures. It is the fourth screen adaptation of the 1909 play The Ghost Breaker by Paul Dickey and Charles W. Goddard, previously filmed under that title in 1914 and 1922 and as The Ghost Breakers in 1940.

Scared Stiff was Carmen Miranda's final film appearance, as she died two years later in August 1955.

Plot
Mary Carroll inherits her family's ancestral home, located on a small island off Cuba, and, despite warnings and death threats, decides to sail to Havana and take possession of the reputedly haunted castle. She is joined by nightclub entertainer Larry Todd who, believing he has killed a mobster, flees New York with a friend, Myron. Once on the island the three enter the eerie castle and, after viewing the ghost of one of Mary's ancestors and fighting off a menacing zombie, find the key to the castle's treasure.

Cast
 Dean Martin as Larry Todd
 Jerry Lewis as Myron Mertz
 Lizabeth Scott as Mary Carroll
 Carmen Miranda as Carmelita Castinha
 George Dolenz as Mr. Cortega
 Dorothy Malone as Rosie
 William Ching as Tony Warren
 Paul Marion as Ramon Cariso / Francisco Cariso
 Jack Lambert as Zombie
 Tony Barr as Trigger
 Leonard Strong as Shorty
 Henry Brandon as Pierre
 Frank Fontaine as The drunk on the pier
 Lyle Latell as Ship Captain

Production
The team's ninth picture, Scared Stiff is a remake of Paramount's previous effort, The Ghost Breakers, a 1940 "scare comedy" starring Bob Hope and Paulette Goddard, also directed by George Marshall. The property has proven successful for Paramount in decades past and they've also filmed two versions in the silent era The Ghost Breaker (1914) directed by Cecil B. DeMille and The Ghost Breaker (1922) starring Wallace Reid.

Martin and Lewis had a cameo in Hope and Bing Crosby's Road to Bali the previous year as part of a "comedy trade" between the two teams. In turn, Hope and Crosby appear for a cameo in Scared Stiff. Both shared a common producer, Cy Howard, who produced Martin and Lewis' first two My Friend Irma pictures and That's My Boy. A few years later, Martin and Frank Sinatra appeared in the final scene of the final Hope and Crosby road picture, Road to Hong Kong.

According to Lewis, both he and Martin were against making the picture, as they found the original to be satisfactory.  However, because the film was a Paramount property that producer Hal B. Wallis felt was one that could be successful in the comedy team's hands, he held the two to their contract for the film.

Scared Stiff was filmed from June 2 through July 17, 1952.  It was the first film of the team's available in 3-track, stereophonic sound.  Some reviews at the time commented on the soundtrack's use of stereo enhancing gag sequences. The stereo tracks for this film are now considered lost. As with most films of team's work, it garnered a re-release in 1958 on a double bill with another Martin and Lewis picture, Jumping Jacks.

Norman Lear was credited with "additional dialogue." It was his first writing credit on a Hollywood film.

Scared Stiff turned out to be the last film for Carmen Miranda who died two years later, shortly after completing an episode of The Jimmy Durante Show on TV. In the film, Jerry Lewis impersonates Miranda and lip syncs one of her signature numbers, "Mamãe Eu Quero".

Home media
Paramount released Scared Stiff on home video in November 1992.  The film was included on an eight-film DVD set, the Dean Martin and Jerry Lewis Collection: Volume One, released on October 31, 2006.

Reception
Bosley Crowther of The New York Times wrote, "The nonsense herein contrived is not an inspired presentation of the comic qualities of the two boys."  Variety wrote that Martin and Lewis "provide a free-wheeling round of slapstick hilarity".  Writing in The Zombie Movie Encyclopedia, academic Peter Dendle called the film an annoying remake that "mostly sticks to the original except for the addition of several bad song and dance numbers and even worse comedy routines".

On Rotten Tomatoes the film holds a rating of 71% based on 7 reviews, with an average rating of 5.83/10.

References

External links

 
 
 

1953 films
1950s comedy horror films
1950s comedy mystery films
1953 musical comedy films
American black-and-white films
American comedy horror films
American comedy mystery films
Remakes of American films
American films based on plays
American haunted house films
American musical comedy films
American zombie comedy films
1950s English-language films
Films directed by George Marshall
Films produced by Hal B. Wallis
Films scored by Leith Stevens
Films set in castles
Films set in Cuba
Paramount Pictures films
1950s American films